Nyimang, also known as Ama, is an East Sudanic language spoken in the Nuba Mountains.

It is spoken in Al Fous, Fuony, Hajar Sultan, Kakara, Kalara, Koromiti, Nitil, Salara, Tundia, and other villages (Ethnologue, 22nd edition).

Rilly (2010:182) lists two mutually unintelligible varieties, Ama and Mandal. Blench lists the Mandal dialect separately.

Phonology

Consonants 

 /s/ is heard as [ʃ] when before front vowels.

Vowels 

 /i, u/ can be heard as [ɪ, u] in lax position.

References

External links
Ama basic lexicon at the Global Lexicostatistical Database

Languages of Sudan
Nyima languages
Northern Eastern Sudanic languages